Niels Arntzen Sem (10 February 1782–19 December 1859) was a Norwegian politician.

He was elected to the Norwegian Parliament in 1825 and 1827, representing the constituency of Stavanger Amt. He worked as district  magistrate for Jæren from 1823 until 1828.

In 1828, he was appointed County Governor of Buskeruds Amt. While working in Buskerud, he was elected to the Norwegian Parliament to represent that county in 1830. In 1831, he was appointed as Diocesan Governor of Akershus stiftamt as well as County Governor of Akershus amt (one of its subordinate counties). He held that post until 1837 when he was transferred to another county. He then served as Diocesan Governor of Christianssand stiftamt as well as County Governor of Lister og Mandals amt (one of its subordinate counties). While working in Christianssand, he was elected to the Norwegian Parliament in 1842 and 1845.

In 1830 and 1845 he was President of the Storting, sharing the position with several people.

From 1846 to 1857 he was again appointed as the County Governor of Christiania Stiftamt. From October 1852 until 12 April 1853 he was an acting member of the Council of State Division in interim in Stockholm, founded during King Oscar I's illness.

References

1782 births
1859 deaths
Norwegian jurists
Presidents of the Storting
Members of the Storting
County governors of Norway
Government ministers of Norway
19th-century Norwegian people